The WJ & JE Cearns Invitation is a greyhound racing competition held annually at Central Park Stadium. It was inaugurated at (Wimbledon) in 1951 as the W.J.Cearns Memorial Trophy following the death of W.J (Bill) Cearns in 1950.

W.J.Cearns was the founder of Wimbledon Stadium and chairman of West Ham United F.C. The event was held in his honour until 2006 when his grandson Roger Cearns (owner of Central Park) brought the competition to Sittingbourne. It was renamed the WJ & JE Cairns Invitation with the JE part being named after his father John who was also instrumental in the history of Wimbledon.

Past winners

Venues and distances 
1951-1974	(Wimbledon, 500 yards) 
1975-2005	(Wimbledon, 660 metres) 
2015-2016 (not held)
2006–present	(Sittingbourne/Central Park, 500m)

References

Greyhound racing competitions in the United Kingdom
Recurring sporting events established in 1951
Sport in Sittingbourne
Greyhound racing in London